Adrian Andre Johnson (born May 25, 1975) is an American umpire in Major League Baseball. He wears uniform number 80.

Career
He also officiated in the 2006 World Baseball Classic. Johnson was named to the full-time Major League staff prior to the 2010 season. He was promoted to crew chief in 2023.

Notable Games
Johnson was the home plate umpire for Edwin Jackson's no-hitter on June 25, 2010.

He was the home plate umpire when the New York Yankees hit a record three grand slams against the Oakland Athletics on August 25, 2011.

He was at third base on June 1, 2012, when Johan Santana no-hit the St. Louis Cardinals, making a controversial "foul ball" ruling over a hard ground ball hit by Carlos Beltrán in the sixth inning.

On July 2, 2013, Johnson was the home plate umpire when Homer Bailey of the Cincinnati Reds pitched a no-hitter against the San Francisco Giants at Great American Ballpark.

Johnson served as the left field umpire in the 2016 MLB All-Star Game in San Diego.

Johnson worked in his first postseason in 2017, serving as an umpire during the 2017 American League Division Series.

See also 

 List of Major League Baseball umpires

References

External links
Major League profile
Retrosheet

Living people
1975 births
Sportspeople from Houston
African-American sports officials
Major League Baseball umpires
21st-century African-American sportspeople
20th-century African-American sportspeople